Edward James Bennell (1939 – January 1991) was a playwright, prose writer, and boxer from Western Australia.

He was born Thomas Bennell in 1939 near Brookton. His parents were Edward Sterling Bennell and Elsie May Bennel (née Bolton), and Eddie was the youngest in a family of three brothers (Brain, Avon, Wayne) and one sister (Nancy). Eddie lived on an aboriginal mission on the outskirts of Brookton in his youth.

Eddie married Rhonda Sully (now Winmar). They lived their early years on the mission outside of Brookton, having two girls Tracy and May. A few years later they moved the family near "the big smoke"(Perth), staying in Maylands first. Then having Olman, Eddie, and Maxine. In the mid 1980s while living in Gosnells, 2 more children were to complete the immediate family Allan and Kirsty (adopted). 

Eddie and his father Edward took "dog tags" to be able to move around a bit more to get a job in the hope of advancing their families and relations lives. He was close to his uncle Jack Davis, an aboriginal playwright of the 1980s. Jack was a large influence on Eddie's playwriting future.

In 1974 he served as the inaugural chairman of the National Aboriginal Commission, in Canberra.

He died on 18 January 1991 at Sir Charles Gardiner Hospital. Eddie's last place living with his family was Coolbellup. in Fremantle.

Bibliography 
Bennell published 22 works in his life, including the following:
 1975: Whither the Aborigines and the N.A.C
 1980: Aboriginal legends from the Bibulmun tribe (translated into Chinese in 1983)
 1990: The silent years
 Flight of an Eagle
 Waargle
 1993: My Spiritual Dreaming

References

External links 
 Biographical cuttings about Eddie Bennell at the National Library
 Photo of Bennel in 1981 with his book Aboriginal Legends

Noongar people
1939 births
1991 deaths